XHJUX-FM is a radio station on 94.7 FM in Santiago Juxtlahuaca, Oaxaca. It is known as InspiraZion Radio and broadcasts a Christian format.

History
XHJUX was awarded its social concession on December 14, 2016, more than three years after the initial application was filed on April 8, 2013.

References

Radio stations in Oaxaca